The Green Liberal Party of Switzerland (glp; , pvl), abbreviated to glp, is a green-liberal political party in Switzerland. Founded in 2007, the party holds sixteen seats in the Federal Assembly as of the October 2019 election.

The party was formed on 19 July 2007 by four cantonal branches of the Green Party. Contesting the election in October 2007 in St. Gallen and Zurich, the party won three seats in the National Council.  A month later, the party won a seat in the Council of States, with Verena Diener representing Zurich. The party has since expanded across Switzerland, and holds seats in thirteen cantonal legislatures in German-speaking Switzerland and the Romandy. The party reached 5.4% at the 2011 federal election, increasing the number of Members of the National Council from 3 to 12, suffered a setback in 2015 retreating to 7 seats with 4,6% of the national vote, only to recover in 2019 by winning 16 seats with 7.8% of the vote.

The Green Liberals are a party of the political centre, as opposed to the left-wing Green Party.  They seek to combine liberalism on civil liberties and moderate economic liberalism with environmental sustainability. The party has an autonomous parliamentary group in the Federal Assembly of Switzerland since the 2011 federal election.

History

The party was founded on 19 July 2007 by four cantonal parties of the same name that had seceded from the Green Party.  These branches were in Basel-Landschaft, Bern, St. Gallen, and Zurich.

In the 2007 election to the National Council on 22 October 2007, the party ran in Zurich and St. Gallen.  Despite being limited to only two cantons, the party won 1.4% of the popular vote nationwide and 3 out of 200 seats. In Zurich, they won 7% of the vote. One of these three had been a National Councillor for the Green Party in the previous Parliament.

A month later, it won a seat in the Council of States, with Verena Diener representing Zurich.  Along with the first appearance of the Green Party, this was the first time a minor party had won representation in the Council of States since 1995.  When the Federal Assembly convened, the glp joined the Christian Democrats/EPP/glp Group, making it the second-largest group, behind the Swiss People's Party. In 2010 the party got an additional seat in the Council of States with Markus Stadler from Uri.

Since April 2022 there are cantonal parties in all 26 cantons. 

The glp was one of the leading political parties for legalising same-sex marriage in Switzerland, in which it was adopted in an optional referendum on 26 September 2021.

In October 2021, the glp introduced a new, refreshed logo with the French slogan  (creators of the future).

Elected representatives

Council of States
None since the 2015 election.

National Council
2019-2023 legislature:
 Martin Bäumle
 Kathrin Bertschy
 Isabelle Chevalley (until 2021)
 Beat Flach
 Jürg Grossen
 Tiana Angelina Moser
 Judith Bellaïche
 Thomas Brunner
 Katja Christ
 Roland Fischer
 Corina Gredig
 Jörg Mäder
 Michel Matter
 Melanie Mettler
 François Pointet
 Barbara Schaffner
 Céline Weber (since 2021)

See also 
 Environmental movement in Switzerland

References

External links

2007 establishments in Switzerland
Centrist parties in Switzerland
Green liberalism
Green political parties in Switzerland
Liberal parties in Switzerland
Political parties established in 2007
Pro-European political parties in Switzerland
Swiss Climate Alliance
Social liberal parties